Qeshlaq-e Jadid (also Romanized as Qeshlāq-e Jadīd; also known as Owch Āghel and Ūchāghel) is a village in Qeshlaq Rural District, in the Central District of Ahar County, East Azerbaijan Province, Iran. At the 2006 census, its population was 52, in 11 families.

References 

Populated places in Ahar County